Mark Grimmette (born January 23, 1971) is an American luger who competed from 1990 to 2010. Competing in five Winter Olympics, he won two medals in the men's doubles event with a silver in 2002 and a bronze in 1998. He was born in Ann Arbor, Michigan.

Grimmette also won nine medals at the FIL World Luge Championships with two silvers (Mixed team: 2004, 2005) and seven bronzes (Men's doubles: 1999, 2000, 2004, 2005, 2007, 2009; Mixed team: 2001). He won the overall Luge World Cup men's doubles title three times (1997–1998, 1998–1999, 2002–2003). He was selected in December 2009 to compete in the 2010 Winter Olympics.

Grimmette carried the United States flag during the opening ceremony of the 2010 Winter Olympics in Vancouver.

He announced his retirement on March 17, 2010.

On April 29, 2010, it was announced that Grimmette was named USA Luge's Sports Program Director and also was involved as a head coach.

Personal life
Mark Grimmette lived in Muskegon, Michigan and graduated from Reeths-Puffer High School originally, but moved to Lake Placid, New York after being named to his current position. He lives there with his wife Keela, founder of www.reason2smile.org. Grimmette and his wife Keela have three children.

A biography of Mark Grimmette is 9.8 Meters Per Second Per Second by Jean E. Van Lente.

Grimmette attended the University of Denver in the early 1990s.

References

 1994 luge men's doubles results
 2006 luge men's doubles results
 DatabaseOlympics.com profile on Grimmette.
 FIL-Luge profile
  (April 29, 2010 article accessed April 29, 2010.)
 Fuzilogik Sports – Winter Olympic results – Men's luge
 Hickoksports.com results on Olympic champions in luge and skeleton.
 Hickok sports information on World champions in luge and skeleton.
 List of men's doubles luge World Cup champions since 1978.
 Official website of Grimmette and Martin
 USA Luge profile of Grimmette and Martin

External links
 
 
 
 

1971 births
Living people
American male lugers
Olympic lugers of the United States
Olympic silver medalists for the United States in luge
Olympic bronze medalists for the United States in luge
Lugers at the 1994 Winter Olympics
Lugers at the 1998 Winter Olympics
Lugers at the 2002 Winter Olympics
Lugers at the 2006 Winter Olympics
Lugers at the 2010 Winter Olympics
Medalists at the 2002 Winter Olympics
Medalists at the 1998 Winter Olympics
Sportspeople from Ann Arbor, Michigan
20th-century American people
21st-century American people